This is a list of United Nations Security Council Resolutions 1301 to 1400 adopted between 31 May 2000 and 28 March 2002.

See also 
 Lists of United Nations Security Council resolutions
 List of United Nations Security Council Resolutions 1201 to 1300
 List of United Nations Security Council Resolutions 1401 to 1500

1301